Haylee Outteridge is an Australian sailor, a resident of Lake Macquarie.

Haylee, (together with her brother Nathan) campaigned for the 2020 Summer Olympics in the mixed Nacra 17 class.

Career

World Championships

References

External links
 

Living people
Australian female sailors (sport)
Year of birth missing (living people)
21st-century Australian women